Yuri Vasilyevich Gavrilov (born May 3, 1953 in Setun, Odintsovsky District, Moscow Oblast) is a Russian football manager and a former midfielder who played for Dynamo Moscow and Spartak Moscow.

He made 46 appearances for the Soviet Union national football team and scored 10 goals. He also competed for the Soviet Union at the 1980 Summer Olympics and the 1982 FIFA World Cup in Spain. His creative skills are immortalized by Konstantin Beskov's famous phrase "If you don't know what to do with the ball, pass it to Gavrilov". Yuri Gavrilov has his own football school in Moscow called SC Svyatogor.

Career 
Gavrilov's football career started in Iskra Moscow football school when he was 7. He was invited by school director who saw Yury playing with other kids on the Iskra stadium. When he was 19, Konstantin Beskov took him to Dinamo Moscow from Iskra amateur team. But there was an expensive number of quality players in 1970s Dinamo, and Gavrilov couldn't find a permanent place in Dinamo squad.

Gavrilov followed Konstantin Beskov into Spartak Moscow in 1977. Gavrilov achieved the key playmaker role in new Spartak Moscow team built up by Beskov. After being winger in Dinamo, Gavrilov's new role in Spartak team let him show his best abilities and proved himself one of the all-time best Soviet football creative mid-fielders.

While he made a lot of good passes, he scored a lot of goals as well. Gavrilov was Soviet Top League top goal-scorer twice, scored 140 times during his career.

During his professional career Gavrilov played also for the Finnish club Porin Pallotoverit and Moldovan club FC Agro Chişinău.

In 2001 Gavrilov took charge of the DR Congo national football team for one game. He coached DR Congo in the 2002 FIFA World Cup qualification match against Ivory Coast.

External links
 
 
Pictures of Yuri Gavrilov in Finland
YouTube Channel of Yuri Gavrilov
Pictures of Yuri Gavrilov (russian)
Yury Gavrilov Foundation for the support and development of physical culture and sport (russian)

References

1953 births
Living people
People from Odintsovsky District
Soviet footballers
Russian footballers
Soviet expatriate footballers
Russian expatriate footballers
Soviet expatriate sportspeople in Finland
Expatriate footballers in Finland
Expatriate footballers in Moldova
Russian football managers
FC Dynamo Moscow players
FC Spartak Moscow players
FC Lokomotiv Moscow players
FC Asmaral Moscow players
Soviet Top League players
Russian Premier League players
FC Saturn Ramenskoye players
FC Jazz players
FC Spumante Cricova players
Russian expatriate football managers
Expatriate football managers in Moldova
Expatriate football managers in the Democratic Republic of the Congo
Democratic Republic of the Congo national football team managers
Footballers at the 1980 Summer Olympics
Olympic bronze medalists for the Soviet Union
Olympic footballers of the Soviet Union
Russian expatriate sportspeople in Moldova
1982 FIFA World Cup players
Soviet Union international footballers
Olympic medalists in football
Medalists at the 1980 Summer Olympics
Association football midfielders
FC Agro-Goliador Chișinău managers
Sportspeople from Moscow Oblast